The Bomb Bassets were an American rock and roll band formed by brothers Dallas Denery of Sweet Baby and John Denery of The Hi-Fives, Mr. T Experience frontman Dr. Frank and producer Kevin Army on bass; they were joined by Mr. T Experience drummer, Jim Pittman. Bass player Joel Reader later joined the band for their 1997 full-length record, making the entire Mr T. Experience members of the band at that point.

In 1995 the band released two separately titled EP:s through Lookout Records. Please Don't Die included four songs and was released only as a vinyl 7-inch while the CD-EP Dress Rehearsal had a cover of similar style, included the same four songs and three bonus tracks not found on the vinyl.

On July 29, 1997, the band released their first and only full-length record Take a Trip with the Bomb Bassets.

References

American rock music groups